The 1923 Loyola Wolf Pack football team was an American football team that represented Loyola College of New Orleans (now known as Loyola University New Orleans) as an independent during the 1923 college football season. In its third and final season under head coach William Flynn, the team compiled a 5–1–1 record and outscored opponents by a total of 104 to 41.

Schedule

References

Loyola
Loyola Wolf Pack football seasons
Loyola Wolf Pack football